The 2018 Team Long Track World Championship was the 12th annual FIM Team Long Track World Championship. The final took place on 1 September 2018 in Morizès, France.

Results
  Morizès
 1 September 2018

See also
 2018 Individual Long Track World Championship
 2018 Speedway of Nations

References

Team Long Track World Championship